KWMC may refer to:

 KWMC (AM), a radio station (1490 AM) licensed to Del Rio, Texas, United States
 Winnemucca Municipal Airport (ICAO code KWMC)
 Koyambedu Wholesale Market Complex